The Red Lion and Sun Society of Iran was established in 1922 and admitted to the International Red Cross and Red Crescent Movement in 1923. However, some report the symbol was introduced at Geneva in 1864  as a counter example to the crescent and cross used by two of Iran's rivals, the Ottoman Empire (modern-day Turkey) and Russia.

Though that claim is inconsistent with the history of the Red Crescent, that history also suggests that the Red Lion and Sun, like the Red Crescent, may have been conceived during the Russo-Turkish War (1877–1878).  It may have also been partly inspired by the similarities between the Red Crescent and the Ottoman flag.

In 1980, because of the association of the emblem with the last Shah, the newly proclaimed Islamic Republic of Iran replaced the Red Lion and Sun with the Red Crescent, consistent with most other Muslim nations. Though the Red Lion and Sun has now fallen into disuse, Iran has in the past reserved the right to take it up again at any time; the Geneva Conventions continue to recognize it as an official emblem, and that status was confirmed by Protocol III in 2005 even as it added the Red Crystal.

See also
 Order of the Red Lion and the Sun
 Emblems of the International Red Cross and Red Crescent Movement
 Lion and Sun

References

External links 

 Red Cross and Red Crescent Club

Insignia
International Red Cross and Red Crescent Movement
Medical and health organisations based in Iran
1922 establishments in Iran
Organizations established in 1922
Emergency management in Iran